La Nationale (formerly Nationale Regionale Transport) is a domestic airline based in Libreville, Gabon. Its main base is Libreville International Airport. It was rebranded in 2009 from National Airways Gabon to La Nationale.

Destinations

Fleet

Current
, The Nationale Regionale Transport fleet includes the following aircraft:

Previously operated
Nationale Regionale Transport has also operated the following aircraft:

Saab 340A

Accidents and Incidents
 On October 12, 2011, a Nationale Regionale Transport EMB-120, registration ZS-PYO (MSN: 120245) performing a charter flight from Libreville to Port Gentil (Gabon), overran runway 21's end and came to a stop with the nose gear intact, both main gear struts bent backwards causing the engines to "pitch down" together with the wings. A few passengers sustained minor injuries, but the aircraft was damaged beyond repair and was written off

References

External links
Nationale Regionale Transport Fleet

Airlines of Gabon
Airlines established in 2002
Airlines formerly banned in the European Union
Companies based in Libreville
Gabonese companies established in 2002